The men's 1000 meter at the 2023 KNSB Dutch Single Distance Championships took place in Heerenveen at the Thialf ice skating rink on Sunday 5 February 2023. There were 22 participants. Kjeld Nuis, Hein Otterspeer, and Thomas Krol qualified for the 2023 ISU World Speed Skating Championships in Heerenveen.

Statistics

Result

 WDR = Withdrew
Referee: Bert Timmermans. Assistant: Frank Spoel. 
Starter: Janny Smegen 

Source:

Draw

References

Single Distance Championships
2023 Single Distance